Bunga Nyimas Cinta (born 13 April 2006) is an Indonesian skateboarder who has competed in the Asian Games. She became the youngest medalist in the 2018 Asian Games at age 12 when she won bronze in the women's street event behind gold medalist Margielyn Didal of the Philippines and silver medalist Kaya Isa of Japan.

She first became a follower of skateboarding as a second grader, watching videos related to the discipline on social media. In her fifth grade, Bunga Nyimas started taking skateboarding seriously. She initially aspired to become a doctor but decided to pursue a professional career in skateboarding.

References

Living people
Indonesian skateboarders
2006 births
Female skateboarders
Medalists at the 2018 Asian Games
Skateboarders at the 2018 Asian Games
Asian Games bronze medalists for Indonesia
Asian Games medalists in skateboarding
Competitors at the 2019 Southeast Asian Games
Southeast Asian Games medalists in skateboarding
Southeast Asian Games silver medalists for Indonesia
Southeast Asian Games bronze medalists for Indonesia
21st-century Indonesian women